Mycoplasma iguanae is a species of bacteria in the genus Mycoplasma.

It has been recovered from abscesses of the spine of the green iguana, Iguana iguana.

References

External links

iguanae